Burtnett is a surname. Notable people with the surname include:

Earl Burtnett (1896–1936), American bandleader, songwriter, and pianist
Leon Burtnett (1943–2021), American football coach
Wellington Burtnett (1930–2013), American ice hockey player

See also
Burnett (surname)